Maa Barunei Temple is dedicated to the Hindu Goddess Barunei a manifestation of Shakti. The temple is located on the Barunei Hill in Khordha district of the Indian state of Odisha. The temple has idols of the twin goddesses Barunei and Karunei in the sanctum sanctorum. A beautiful stream flows from the hills which is known as Swarna Ganga, which enhances the beauty of this place.

References

Hindu temples in Khordha district
Shakti temples